David Arthur Coke, DFC, (4 December 1915 – 9 December 1941) was a flight lieutenant in the Royal Air Force Volunteer Reserve during the Second World War, and is credited with two destroyed, two probables, and two damaged aircraft during his service. He is known in popular culture for his friendship with the author Roald Dahl while serving in the Royal Air Force.

Early life and family
The second son of Thomas Coke, 4th Earl of Leicester and Marion Gertrude (née Trefusis), Coke was godson of King Edward VIII of the United Kingdom. He was a graduate of Trinity College, Cambridge.

Second World War
Coke joined the Royal Air Force Volunteer Reserve (RAFVR) in June 1939, the summer before war broke out, and attended No. 5 Operational Training Unit in April 1940. He was promoted to the rank of acting pilot officer on 3 September 1940. By August 1940 he flew a Hawker Hurricane with No. 257 Squadron RAF during the Battle of Britain as a pilot officer. On 12 August 1940, his Hurricane (P3776) was badly shot up over the English Channel off Portsmouth. His finger was amputated and the aircraft was repaired. Posted to 46 Squadron in December 1940, Coke was then promoted to flying officer.

He went on to fight in the Balkans campaign with No. 33 Squadron and the Syria–Lebanon campaign with No. 80 Squadron RAF. During this period with No. 80 squadron, he became friends with famed author Roald Dahl, as detailed in Dahl's autobiography Going Solo.   Dahl described Coke (pronounced "Cook", he said) as:

. . . warm-hearted and brave and generous, and over the next few weeks we were to become close friends. 

When Dahl first arrived as a replacement pilot and met Coke,  Coke told him the RAF's situation was "absolutely hopeless."  He told Dahl: 

'I was in the Battle of Britain before I came here. That was bad enough, but it was peanuts compared to this crazy place. We have no radar here at all . . . The Greeks are our radar. We have a Greek peasant sitting on the top of every mountain for miles around, and when he spots a bunch of German planes he calls up the Ops Room here on a field telephone. That’s our radar." ‘Does it work?’ ‘Now and again it does,’ he said.’  

While serving in Libya, Coke was awarded the Distinguished Flying Cross for his work in an attack on enemy transport and for his leadership as a flight lieutenant. The citation read:

Coke was killed in action by enemy Bf 109s in Acroma, Cyrenaica, Africa on Tuesday 9 December 1941, five days after his twenty-sixth birthday, and buried at Knightsbridge War Cemetery, Acroma, Libya (Ref. B.A. 3. B. 18).

Notes

References

Bibliography
Profile, thepeerage.com; accessed 5 April 2014.

1915 births
1941 deaths
Military personnel from Norfolk
People from Norfolk
Royal Air Force officers
The Few
Royal Air Force pilots of World War II
Recipients of the Distinguished Flying Cross (United Kingdom)
Royal Air Force personnel killed in World War II
Aviators killed by being shot down
Alumni of Trinity College, Cambridge
Younger sons of earls
David
British World War II fighter pilots
Royal Air Force Volunteer Reserve personnel of World War II
Burials at Knightsbridge War Cemetery
Roald Dahl